Lorna Ann Casselton,  (18 July 1938 – 14 February 2014) was a British academic and biologist. She was Professor Emeritus of Fungal Genetics in the Department of Plant Science at the University of Oxford, and was known for her genetic and molecular analysis of the mushroom Coprinus cinereus and Coprinus lagopus.

Early life
Casselton was born on 18 July 1938 in Rochford, Essex to William Charles Henry Smith and Cecile Smith (née Bowman). Her parents' smallholding and her father's interest in natural history and genetics encouraged her and her sister Pauline in the direction of biology. She was educated at Southend High School for Girls, a grammar school in Southend-on-Sea. She studied at University College London, from which she gained a Bachelor of Science (BSc) degree in botany and a Doctor of Philosophy (PhD) degree in 1964.

Academic career
Casselton began her career in lecturing and research as an assistant lecturer at Royal Holloway College in London. She was Professor of Genetics at Queen Mary University of London from 1989 to 1991 and was later awarded an AFRC/BBSRC Postdoctoral Fellowship, followed by a BBSRC Senior Research Fellowship in 1995.

Casselton was a Fellow of St Cross College Oxford from 1993 to 2003, and was appointed Professor of Fungal Genetics at Oxford in 1997. Her specialism was sexual development in fungi and she contributed to over 100 publications on this topic. She was a Fellow of St Cross College, Oxford, from 1993 to 2003, and an Honorary Fellow of St Hilda's College, Oxford, from 2000. She was a member of the Royal Society's Council from 2002 to 2003, and rejoined the Council in 2006 as Vice-President and Foreign Secretary, replacing Professor Dame Julia Higgins.

As Foreign Secretary of the Royal Society, Casselton gave the Royal Society Rutherford Lecture in South Africa and the Blackett Lecture in India, travelling to 27 different countries during three and a half years in office.

Personal life
She married Peter John Casselton in 1961, divorcing him in 1978. She married William Joseph Dennis Tollett in 1981. She died after a short illness, aged 75.

Awards and honours
She was elected a Fellow of the Royal Society in 1999. She became a Member of the Academia Europaea in 2008, and was awarded an Honorary Doctor of Science by Queen Mary College, University of London in 2009 and University College London in September 2010. She was appointed Commander of the Order of the British Empire (CBE) in the 2012 Birthday Honours for services to fungal genetics and international science. Her nomination for the Royal Society reads: 

The British Mycological Society awarded her an Honorary Membership in 2002.

Selected publications

References

1938 births
2014 deaths
20th-century British biologists
20th-century British women scientists
Academics of Queen Mary University of London
Academics of the University of Oxford
Alumni of University College London
British biologists
British women biologists
Commanders of the Order of the British Empire
English geneticists
Fellows of St Cross College, Oxford
Fellows of the Royal Society
Female Fellows of the Royal Society
Members of Academia Europaea
People educated at Southend High School for Girls
People from Rochford
People from Southend-on-Sea
People from Essex